Elections to Tamworth Borough Council were held on 10 June 2004. One third of the council was up for election and the Conservative Party gained overall control of the council from the Labour Party. Overall turnout was 31.4%

After the election, the composition of the council was:
Conservative 16
Labour 13
Independent 1

Election result

Ward results

References
2004 Tamworth election result
Ward results

2004
2004 English local elections
2000s in Staffordshire